This is a partial list of commercial or professional recordings of Johann Sebastian Bach's Goldberg Variations, organized chronologically.  You can alphabetically sort each column by clicking on the small box at the top of that column (click again to sort reverse-alphabetically).

Without recording date - To be inserted in the list
Jörg Demus - mid-1950s - Westminster WL 5241 - piano
Ito Ema - MA Recordings M024A - digitally recorded February 1994
Zuzana Růžičková - Erato – ERA 9034 - Neupert (Mercier-Ythier) harpsichord

References

Discographies of compositions by J. S. Bach